St. Francis High School is a private, Roman Catholic high school in Traverse City, Michigan.  It is located in the Roman Catholic Diocese of Gaylord.

Background
St. Francis High School located in Traverse City, Michigan, and is part of the Grand Traverse Area Catholic Schools. This parochial school system traces its roots back to 1877 when it was founded by the Dominican Sisters.

1877

Father George Ziegler makes an appeal to a priest friend in New Jersey asking for Sisters to help in educating Traverse City’s youth

In October, six young Dominican nuns board a steamship for Traverse City, opening Holy Angels Convent School (located on Union Street) for six pupils on October 29, 1877
1883

The new, 4-floor Holy Angels Academy (convent and boarding school) was dedicated. The building was constructed on land donated by Perry Hannah, and cost $10,000
1902

Immaculate Conception parish was formed to lessen the distance to daily Mass; the new facility was dedicated on February 22, 1906 and it housed the church (upper level) and school (lower level). When it opened in September, the school had 80 students in three classrooms
1955

St. Francis Elementary (today’s Holy Angels Elementary School) opened to students in January with 14 classrooms and a study hall
1969

The Immaculate Conception and St. Francis school systems were consolidated
1998

The newly constructed St. Elizabeth Ann Seton Middle School opened on donated land near Hammond and 3-Mile Road

RECOMMENDED READING

Faith and Knowledge: The History of the Grand Traverse Area Catholic Schools, 2003
2016

An outdoor, All School Mass is celebrated on the site of the new Immaculate Conception Elementary School, marking the start of the Our Faith, Our Future, Our Time capital campaign.
2018

The remaining portion of the old Immaculate Conception School is demolished. A 1961 time capsule is unearthed.
2019

The new Immaculate Conception Elementary School opens for students in Preschool through Grade 5.

Traverse City St. Francis (TCSF) is three-time recipient of Top 50 Catholic high school honors, having earned distinction among the approximately 1,300 Catholic high schools in the United States.

Athletics

Fall sports
 Boys' Football
 Boys' Tennis
 Boys' Soccer
 Boys'/Girls' Cross Country
 Girls' Volleyball
 Girls' Equestrian
 Girls' Cheerleading
 Girls' Golf

 Winter sports
 Boys'/Girls' Basketball
 Boys' Wrestling
 Boys'/Girls' Indoor Track
 Boys'/Girls' Bowling
 Boys'/Girls' Skiing
 Boys' Ice Hockey
 Girls' Ice Skating
 Girls' Pom and Dance

 Spring sports
 Boys'/Girls' Outdoor Track
 Boys' Baseball
 Boys' Golf
 Girls' Softball
 Girls' Tennis
 Girls' Soccer

Football 
The St. Francis Football team has won state titles in 1992, 1999, 2003, 2005, 2008 and 2009.  Other trips to the State Finals include 1983, 1998, and 2007.  Since the playoff system was established in Michigan, TCSF has qualified for the playoffs 23 times.  This includes the current streak of 19 years, which is an MHSAA record.  The Gladiators have an all-time winning percentage of .757 (418-133-4).  Their regular-season winning percentage is .763 (375-115-4) and their playoff winning percentage is .705 (43-18).  The Gladiators are members of the Lake Michigan Conference, which they have won for 6 consecutive seasons.  During this streak, they have not lost a single conference game.  Other members of the Lake Michigan Conference include Boyne City Ramblers, Charlevoix Red Raiders, East Jordan Red Devils, Elk Rapids Elks, Grayling Vikings, Harbor Springs Rams, and Kalkaska Blue Blazers.  Other teams that St. Francis considers its rivals are the Muskegon Catholic Central Crusaders, the Saginaw Nouvel Catholic Central Panthers, and the Kingsley Stags. Although the Benzie Central Huskies have been considered a rival of St. Francis, The record between the teams stands at 37-0 for St. Francis.   St. Francis's top five most played opponents are the Boyne City Ramblers (38 games), Benzonia Benzie Central Huskies (37 games), Manistee Chippewas (34 games), Kalkaska Blue Blazers (34 games), and the Elk Rapids Elks (30 games).  Many Gladiators have gone on to play football at the collegiate level.  The most recent Division I recruits are Max and Riley Bullough who were both recruited by the Michigan State Spartans. Max also went on to play in the NFL for the Houston Texans. Another notable football player to graduate from St. Francis is Fullback Joe Kerridge. Joe walked on to the 2011 University of Michigan Wolverines, quickly earning a full-ride scholarship. In 2015 Kerridge was named Team Captain and is currently a "Player to watch" in the upcoming NFL draft.

Notable alumni
 Angus MacLellan — professional rugby player with the United States national rugby union team
 Damon Sheehy-Guiseppi - professional football player with the Cleveland Browns
 Matt Noveskey - professional singer, songwriter, record producer, guitarist, and bassist, best known for his work with the bands Blue October and (a+)machines.
 Carter Oosterhouse - television personality and model
Max Bullough - former professional football player with the Houston Texans and Cleveland Browns
Riley Bullough - former professional football player with the Tampa Bay Buccaneers and Tennessee Titans
Joe Kerridge - former professional football player with the Green Bay Packers

Notes and references

Roman Catholic Diocese of Gaylord
Traverse City, Michigan
Catholic secondary schools in Michigan
Educational institutions established in 1877
Schools in Grand Traverse County, Michigan
1877 establishments in Michigan